Moston is a civil parish in Cheshire East, England. It contains 16 buildings that are recorded in the National Heritage List for England as designated listed buildings, all of which are at Grade II. This grade is the lowest of the three gradings given to listed buildings and is applied to "buildings of national importance and special interest". The parish contains the village of Moston Green, but is otherwise mainly rural. The Trent and Mersey Canal runs through the parish, and eight of the listed buildings are associated with it, namely bridges, locks, and mileposts. The other listed buildings are farmhouses, farm buildings, a cottage, a club that was originally a farmhouse, and a turnpike milepost.

See also
 Listed buildings in Bradwall
 Listed buildings in Crewe
 Listed buildings in Haslington
 Listed buildings in Middlewich
 Listed buildings in Sandbach
 Listed buildings in Stanthorne
 Listed buildings in Warmingham
 Listed buildings in Wimboldsley

References

Citations

Sources

 

Listed buildings in the Borough of Cheshire East
Lists of listed buildings in Cheshire